Panga Krim is a chiefdom in Pujehun District of Sierra Leone with a population of 6,651. Its principal town is Gobaru.

References

Chiefdoms of Sierra Leone
Southern Province, Sierra Leone